Casey Owens is an American professional basketball coach currently working as head coach for Kazma SC in the Kuwait Federation League 1st Division. He has worked in coaching, player development and scouting at the NBA, NBA D-League, Continental Basketball Association, and international levels.

Early life and education
Owens graduated from Las Cruces High School in Las Cruces, New Mexico. In 1994, he graduated from New Mexico State University with a bachelor's degree in English. In 1996, he earned a master of fine arts in writing & poetics from Naropa University's Jack Kerouac School in Boulder, Colorado.

Career

NBA and D-League
In 2015, Owens was hired as head coach of the L.A. D-Fenders.
During the 2013–2014 season, Casey Owens was the assistant coach of the L.A. D-Fenders.

Casey Owens served an assistant coach for the Colorado 14ers of the NBA D-League from 2007 to 2009, and as an NBA D-League scouting consultant for the Denver Nuggets and Milwaukee Bucks.

On August 17, 2016, the Lakers named Owens assistant coach and advanced scout.

International
Owens served as head coach of Guaiqueries in the Venezuelan Professional League for the 2012–13 season. 
Owens got his start in China as an assistant coach for the Shanghai Sharks in 2009–10. Owens left Shanghai after one season to take the reins as head coach of Fujian SBS for the 2010–11 season. With Owens in charge, Fujian won the Kunming Summer Invitational and the Haiygun CBA Tournament in the same season. He was an assistant coach in the 2011–12 season as for the Xinjiang Flying Tigers of the Chinese Basketball Association, where the team reached the semi-finals.

References

Living people
American male poets
Basketball coaches from New Mexico
Colorado 14ers coaches
Dakota Wizards coaches
Los Angeles D-Fenders coaches
Naropa University alumni
New Mexico State University alumni
Sportspeople from Las Cruces, New Mexico
Place of birth missing (living people)
Poets from New Mexico
Continental Basketball Association coaches
1971 births
21st-century American poets
21st-century American male writers